Mezey is a surname. Notable people with the surname include:

Gustav Mezey, Austrian artist
György Mezey (born 1941), Hungarian footballer and coach
Naomi Mezey, American legal scholar and law professor
Paul Mezey, New York-based independent producer and founder of Journeyman Pictures
Robert Mezey (born 1935), American poet, critic, and academic